The 2022–23 Ekstraklasa (also known as PKO Ekstraklasa due to sponsorship reasons) is the 97th season of the Polish Football Championship, the 89th season of the highest tier domestic division in the Polish football league system since its establishment in 1927 and the 15th season of the Ekstraklasa under its current title. The league is operated by the Ekstraklasa S.A.

The regular season is being played as a round-robin tournament. A total of 18 teams participate, 15 of which competed in the league campaign during the previous season, while the remaining three will be promoted from the 2021–22 I liga. The season will start on 15 July 2022 and will conclude on 27 May 2023. As the 2022 FIFA World Cup will start on 21 November, the last round before stoppage will be held on 12–13 November. The league will resume games on 27 January. Each team will play a total of 34 matches, half at home and half away. It is the second season in the formula with 18 teams, instead of 16. It is expected that the bottom three teams of the final league table will be relegated. It is the sixth Ekstraklasa season to use VAR.

Teams
A total of 18 teams will participate in the 2022–23 Ekstraklasa season.

Changes from last season
Wisła Kraków had been relegated to 2022–23 I liga for the first time since the 1993–94 season ending its twenty six-year stay in the top flight. Bruk-Bet Termalica Nieciecza and Górnik Łęczna have been both relegated ending their one-year stay in the top flight. The 2022-23 season is Miedź Legnica’s return to the top flight after 3 years, having last played in the 2018-19 season. On 22 May after a 2–1 win over Podbeskidzie Bielsko-Biała, Widzew Łódź confirmed their promotion returning to the Ekstraklasa after 8 years, having last played in the 2013–14 season and Korona Kielce returned to the Ekstraklasa after 2 years, having last played in the 2019-20 season.

Stadiums and locations
Note: Table lists in alphabetical order.

 Upgrading to 31,871.
 Due to the renovation of Stadion im. Braci Czachorów in Radom, Radomiak will play home matches at the Stadion Lekkoatletyczno-Piłkarski in Radom.
 Due to the renovation of Dębińska Road Stadium in Poznań, Warta will play home matches at the Stadion Dyskobolii in Grodzisk Wielkopolski.
 Upgrading to 15,004.

Personnel and kits

Managerial changes

Italics for interim managers.

League table

Results

Results by round

Positions by round
Note: The list does not include the matches postponed to a later date but includes all games played in advance.

Season statistics

Top goalscorers

Top assists

Hat-tricks

(4) – player scored four goals.

Awards

Monthly awards

Player of the Month

Young Player of the Month

Coach of the Month

Number of teams by region

See also
2022–23 I liga
2022–23 II liga
2022–23 III liga
2022–23 Polish Cup
2022 Polish Super Cup

Notes

References

Ekstraklasa seasons
2022–23 in Polish football
Poland
Current association football seasons